The  Challenge du Prince is a series of one-day races held annually since 2010 in Morocco. It consists of three races: Trophée de l'Anniversaire, Trophée de la Maison Royale and Trophée Princier, with each rated as a 1.2 event on the UCI Africa Tour.

Winners – Trophée de l'Anniversaire

Winners – Trophée de la Maison Royale

Winners – Trophée Princier

References

Cycle races in Morocco
2010 establishments in Morocco
Recurring sporting events established in 2010
UCI Africa Tour races